Wyman may refer to:

People with the surname Wyman

Wyman (surname)

People with the given or middle name Wyman

Artemas Wyman Sawyer (1827–1907), American Baptist minister
David Wyman Patten (1799–1838), American missionary, leader of the Latter Day Saint movement
Wyman B. S. Moor (1811–1869), American politician
Wyman Guin (1915–1989), science fiction writer
Wyman Spooner (1795–1877), Lieutenant Governor of Wisconsin, United States
Wyman Wong (1969- ), Hong Kong lyricist, fashion columnist, stylist, DJ, actor

Fictional characters 

Wyman Ford, a character in many novels by Douglas Preston
Wyman Manderly, bannerman to House Stark and Lord of White Harbor in the A Song of Ice and Fire book series and Game of Thrones television series by George R.R. Martin

Geography 

Mount Wyman
Wyman, Arkansas
Wyman, Kentucky
Wyman's Brook, a district in the north-west of Cheltenham, Gloucestershire, England, United Kingdom
Wyman, Maine, an unorganized territory in the United States
Wyman, Michigan, unorganized community in Home Township, Montcalm County, Michigan, United States

Ships 

USNS Wyman (T-AGS-34), survey ship of the U.S. Navy
USS Wyman (DE-38), destroyer of the U.S. Navy

Schools  

Wyman School in Excelsior Springs, Missouri